Almtuna IS is a Swedish ice hockey club based in Uppsala and is currently playing in HockeyAllsvenskan, the second highest league of ice hockey in Sweden. The team maintained its place in the Allsvenskan despite suffering relegation in the 2018–19 season following the exit of IK Pantern due to economic troubles prior to the 2019–20 season.

History
Almtuna IS was founded in 1932 with teams in football, bandy and table tennis. In 1947 ice hockey was added to the clubs program.

In the 1980s Almtuna IS became a strictly ice hockey team, and in 2006 they added a women's team.

Season-by-season results
updated December 3, 2013
Some seasons statistics are not available or have not yet been located.

References

External links
 Almtuna IS official website
 Almtuna IS fan club website

Ice hockey teams in Sweden
Ice hockey teams in Uppsala County
Sport in Uppsala
Association football clubs established in 1932
Bandy clubs established in 1932
Ice hockey clubs established in 1932
1932 establishments in Sweden
Defunct bandy clubs in Sweden
HockeyAllsvenskan teams